Frederick John Read (1857–1925), was an English organist and academic.

Read was taught by C. W. Corfe and J. F. Bridge, becoming Organist of Christ Church, Reading, in 1876. He joined the staff of the Royal College of Music ten years later.  During the first period he spent at Chichester, the Harris organ case was installed. Read also seems to have improved the standard of the choir, but The Dean and Chapter of the time took a dim view of absences due to his London teaching work, and so he resigned in 1902.

The peak of Read's teaching career was his appointment as Dean of the Faculty of Music at the University of London. He was reappointed to Chichester on Crowe's retirement and died in office. A memorial to Dr. Read  is in the south transept of the Cathedral.

Some of his anthems and a service in D for men's voices were published by Novello.

References

1857 births
1925 deaths
English organists
British male organists
Organists & Masters of the Choristers of Chichester Cathedral
Academics of the Royal College of Music
Academics of the University of London
Male classical organists